Kimmie Ng is a physician at Dana–Farber Cancer Institute who is known for her work on colorectal cancer in young patients.

Education and career 
Ng has an undergraduate degree from Yale University (1997) and earned her M.D. from the University of Pennsylvania in 2001. Subsequently she trained at the University of California, San Francisco and Dana–Farber Cancer Institute. In 2007, she received a masters in public health from Harvard University. As of 2021, Ng is a physician at the Dana–Farber Cancer Institute and a professor at Harvard Medical School. Ng is the director of Dana-Farber's Young-Onset Colorectal Cancer Center.

Research 
Ng is known for her work in gastrointestinal cancer, with a particular focus in addressing the rise in colorectal cancer in people under the age of fifty. In college, Ng focused on laboratory-based research in biochemistry. She shifted her focus to medicine where her research has shown increased survival in colorectal cancer patients following the consumption of vitamin D, research that has been widely covered by the media. She has also written about the survival rates in young patients with colorectal cancer. Ng has advocated for lowering the age of screening for colorectal cancer, and has spoken in multiple venues about the need to increase colorectal cancer screening for younger people. Ng also investigates the role of diet and microbiome in colorectal cancer, including one project that examined coffee intake by colorectal patients. Ng leads a 2021 research project that uses social media to connect with colorectal cancer patients. Ng has spoken about the impact of the COVID-19 pandemic on her personal life, and how the pandemic impacts treatment and diagnoses for cancer patients.

Selected publications

Awards and honors 
In 2020, Ng received a young investigator award from Conquer Cancer, a foundation run by the American Society of Clinical Oncology.

References 

Yale University alumni
University of Pennsylvania alumni
Harvard Medical School faculty
Women physicians
Oncologists
Cancer researchers
Year of birth missing (living people)
Living people
Harvard School of Public Health alumni